The Lilac Bus is a collection of eight interrelated short stories by the writer Maeve Binchy, first published in 1984.  The stories were republished by Delacorte Press in 1991 together with the earlier 4-story collection, Dublin 4, under the title The Lilac Bus: Stories.

Plot summary
Set in the 1960s and 1970s, the book follows a group of seven people from the fictional village of Rathdoon in West Ireland, who all live in Dublin and return home each weekend on a lilac-colored minibus. Each chapter focuses on a different character, with events described in a previous chapter making their reappearance with new repercussions.

Themes
The book explores how 20th-century characters with strong Roman Catholic values cope with problems such as alcoholism, homosexuality, unwanted pregnancy, infidelity, drug use, divorce, birth control, and abortion.

TV movie
The book was made into a television movie in 1990, directed by Giles Foster and starring Con O'Neill, Stephanie Beacham, and Beatie Edney.

References

1984 short story collections
Irish short story collections
Short stories set in Ireland
Short stories adapted into films
Works by Maeve Binchy